The 1927–28 UCLA Bruins men's basketball team represented the University of California, Los Angeles during the 1927–28 NCAA men's basketball season and were members of the Pacific Coast Conference. The Bruins were led by seventh year head coach Caddy Works. They finished the regular season with a record of 10–5 and were third in the southern division with a record of 5–4.

Previous season

The Grizzlies finished the season 12–4 overall and were SCIAC champions with a record of 9–1. In 1927, the Regents of the University of California changed the name of the Southern Branch of the University of California to the University of California at Los Angeles.

Roster

Schedule

|-
!colspan=9 style=|Regular Season

Source

References

UCLA Bruins
UCLA Bruins men's basketball seasons
UCLA Bruins Basketball
UCLA Bruins Basketball